The Eurovision Song Contest 2023 is the upcoming 67th edition of the Eurovision Song Contest. Organised by the European Broadcasting Union (EBU) and host broadcaster the British Broadcasting Corporation (BBC) on behalf of the Public Broadcasting Company of Ukraine (UA:PBC), the contest will be held at the Liverpool Arena, and will consist of two semi-finals on 9 and 11 May, and a final on 13 May 2023. The three live shows will be presented by British singer Alesha Dixon, British actress Hannah Waddingham and Ukrainian singer Julia Sanina, with Irish television presenter Graham Norton joining for the final. 

Location 

[{
	"type":"Feature",
	"geometry":{"type":"Point","coordinates":[-2.9917,53.3974]},
	"properties":{"title":"Liverpool Arena","marker-symbol":"stadium","marker-color":"#f00","marker-size":"large"}
},{
	"type":"ExternalData",
	"service":"geoshape","ids":"Q5306379",
	"properties":{"title":"Liverpool Arena","fill":"#f00","stroke":"#f00"}
},{
	"type":"Feature",
	"geometry":{"type":"Point","coordinates":[-2.9995,53.4082]},
	"properties":{"title":"Eurovision Village","marker-symbol":"village","marker-color":"#00f"}
},{
	"type":"Feature",
	"geometry":{"type":"Point","coordinates":[-2.9805,53.3945]},
	"properties":{"title":"EuroClub","marker-symbol":"bar","marker-color":"#00f"}
}]

The 2023 contest will be held in Liverpool, United Kingdom. The selected venue is the 11,000-seat Liverpool Arena, a multi-purpose indoor arena located in the ACC Liverpool complex, which serves as a venue for events including concerts and sports. The venue has previously hosted the 2008 MTV Europe Music Awards, the BBC Sports Personality of the Year in 2008 and 2017, and the 2022 World Artistic Gymnastics Championships.

In addition to the main venue, the host city will also organise side events in tandem with the contest. The Eurovision Village is the official Eurovision Song Contest fan and sponsors area during the event weeks. At the Village, it will be possible to watch performances by contest participants and local artists, as well as the three live shows broadcast from the main venue. It is set to be located at the Pier Head and open from 5 to 13 May 2023. The EuroClub, which will take place at Camp and Furnace, will host the official after-parties and private performances by contest participants. A two-week cultural festival called EuroFest will take place across Liverpool from 1 to 14 May 2023, and will feature collaborations between British and Ukrainian artists.

Host country selection 
However, in light of the 2022 Russian invasion of Ukraine, speculation was raised that the country would not be capable of hosting the event. Due to this, several countries expressed interest in hosting in the event that Ukraine could not, including Belgium, Italy, the Netherlands, Poland, Spain (which later withdrew its interest), Sweden, and the United Kingdom.

On 16 May 2022, chairman of the Ukrainian participating broadcaster UA:PBC, stated that they wish to host the contest in a peaceful Ukraine and hoped that the country would be able to guarantee the safety of all participants and their delegations during the event. Chernotytskyi stated on 20 May that the broadcaster would begin discussions with the EBU regarding the hosting of the contest. Numerous Ukrainian politicians advocated for the contest to take place in the country, including Ukrainian president Volodymyr Zelenskyy, who stated his hope for the event to take place one day in Mariupol; the first deputy head of the Kyiv City State Administration, Mykola Povoroznyk, who declared Kyiv's readiness to host; Ukrainian minister of culture, Oleksandr Tkachenko, who stated his intention to discuss conditional changes with the EBU in order to allow the contest to be held in the country; and Ukrainian government representative for the Verkhovna Rada, Taras Melnychuk, who announced the formation of a committee to aid the organisation of the event.

On 16 June 2022, UA:PBC and the Ukrainian government held a meeting with the EBU to discuss potential hosting options in Ukraine. At the meeting, UA:PBC proposed Lviv, Zakarpattia and Kyiv as potential host locations. The following day, the EBU announced that Ukraine would not be able to host the contest, following assessments with both UA:PBC and third-party specialists, and that discussions would begin with the BBC for potentially hosting in the United Kingdom, which finished in second place in the 2022 contest with the song "Space Man" by Sam Ryder. In response, UA:PBC chairman Chernotytskyi and Ukrainian minister of culture Tkachenko, alongside former Ukrainian Eurovision winners Ruslana, Jamala and Oleh Psiuk of Kalush Orchestra, issued a joint statement requesting further talks with the EBU on hosting the event in Ukraine. This stance was supported by then-British prime minister Boris Johnson, the Polish broadcaster TVP, Polish deputy prime minister and minister of culture Piotr Gliński, and then-British culture secretary Nadine Dorries. A follow-up statement from the EBU on 23 June reaffirmed its decision to not host the event in Ukraine, highlighting the security considerations for doing so while also urging for the process of choosing the host country to not be politicised.

On 25 July 2022, the EBU, UA:PBC and the BBC announced that the 2023 contest would be held in the United Kingdom, with the host city bidding process to commence in the same week.

Host city bidding phase 

Simultaneously with the confirmation that the United Kingdom would host the contest on behalf of Ukraine, host broadcaster BBC launched the bidding process on 25 July 2022. The BBC stated that "any potential candidates must meet a set of minimum standards that demonstrate they have the capacity, capability, and experience to host an event of this scale and complexity." The selection criteria for the host city in previous years have included: a venue capable of accommodating at least 10,000 spectators, a press centre for a maximum of 1,500 journalists, easy access to an international airport, and hotel accommodation for at least 2,000 delegates, journalists and spectators.

During the first stage of the bidding process, the BBC received expressions of interest from 20 UK cities and towns, seven of which were shortlisted on 12 August 2022: Birmingham, Glasgow, Leeds, Liverpool, Manchester, Newcastle, and Sheffield. These cities went to the second stage, where they had until 8 September to develop their bids in detail for evaluation by the BBC, who also conducted visits to the cities throughout the month. On 27 September, Glasgow and Liverpool were announced to have made the final shortlist, and on 7 October, the EBU and the BBC announced Liverpool as the host city, with the Liverpool Arena as the chosen venue for the contest.

Key:
 Host venue
 Final shortlist
 Shortlisted
 Submitted a bid

Production 
The Eurovision Song Contest 2023 will be produced by the British public broadcaster British Broadcasting Corporation (BBC). The Ukrainian public broadcaster UA:PBC will work with the BBC to develop and implement Ukrainian elements for the live shows, including theme artwork, background music, selection of presenters, and opening and interval acts. The three shows will be produced by BBC Studios Entertainment Productions and BBC Studios Music Productions, part of the BBC's commercial subsidiary BBC Studios.

The senior production team consists of Martin Green as managing director, Rachel Ashdown as lead commissioner, Andrew Cartmell as executive producer, Lee Smithurst as head of show, Twan van de Nieuwenhuijzen as head of contest, and James O'Brien as executive in charge of production. Additional production personnel includes multi-camera directors Nikki Parsons, Richard Valentine and Ollie Bartlett, lead creative director Dan Shipton, music director Kojo Samuel, stage designer Julio Himede, head of sound Robert Edwards, and lighting designer Tim Routledge.

Visual design 

On 7 October 2022, along with the host city announcement, the EBU revealed the generic logo for the 2023 contest. The Eurovision heart, which typically has the flag of the host country placed in its centre, contains the Ukrainian flag for this year to reflect the country's win the previous year. The 'Song Contest' text is accompanied below by 'United Kingdom' and further down by 'Liverpool 2023'.

The theme art and slogan for the contest, "United by Music", was unveiled on 31 January 2023. Designed by London-based brand consultancy Superunion and Ukrainian production company Starlight Media, the artwork was built around a string of two-dimensional hearts resembling an electrocardiogram, representing response to rhythm and sound, while the colours were inspired by those of the Ukrainian and British flags. The typeface, Penny Lane, was inspired by 20th-century Liverpool street signs and the city's musical heritage.

Presenters 

On 22 February 2023, the presenters line-up for the 2023 contest was announced. British singer Alesha Dixon, British actress Hannah Waddingham, and Ukrainian singer Julia Sanina will host all three shows of the event, with Irish television presenter and the BBC's commentator for the contest since , Graham Norton, joining for the final. Timur Miroshnychenko (who had co-hosted the ) and British sports and television personality Sam Quek will host the "Turquoise Carpet" and Opening Ceremony events.

Stage design 
The stage design for the 2023 contest was revealed on 2 February 2023. Designed by New York-based set designer Julio Himede, the stage design was based on "the principles of togetherness, celebration and community", taking inspiration from a wide hug and the "cultural aspects and similarities between Ukraine, the UK and specifically Liverpool". The stage is 450 square metres wide, with 220 square metres of independently rotating LED screens, over 700 LED floor tiles and more than 1500 metres of LED lights.

Opening and interval acts 
Information about the opening and interval acts will be released in April 2023, closer to the event.

Format

Voting changes 

On 22 November 2022, the EBU announced changes to the voting system for the 2023 contest. In the event that a country cannot deliver a televoting result for the semi-finals, a backup jury result would be used, and should the issue persist into the final, the jury points awarded in the final would be doubled, replacing the previous procedure of using an algorithm to calculate and assign points based on countries with similar voting patterns. If a country's jury is disqualified, the televoting points from that country would be doubled and used as a substitute in the final, effectively reversing a change made in 2016 that provided for calculating points, rather than reverting to purely the jury or televote score. The procedure of using calculated points would remain as a last resort in the event that a country cannot deliver a valid jury or televoting result. Viewers from non-participating countries would also be able to vote in all shows, with their votes being aggregated and presented as one individual set of points under "Rest of the World". Those viewers would be able to cast votes via an online platform, which requires ownership of a credit or debit card for verification.

Entries 
For the third year in a row, delegations have the option to use pre-recorded backing vocals, though each delegation can still use live backing singers – whether on or off stage – or a combination of live and recorded backing vocals. However, all lead vocals and lead dubs performing the melody of the song must still be live.

Semi-final allocation draw 

The draw to determine the participating countries' semi-finals took place on 31 January 2023 at 19:00 GMT (20:00 CET), at St George's Hall. The thirty-one semi-finalists were divided over five pots, based on historical voting patterns as calculated by the contest's official televoting partner Digame. The purpose of drawing from different pots was to reduce the chance of "bloc voting" and to increase suspense in the semi-finals. The ceremony was hosted by AJ Odudu and Rylan, and included the passing of the host city insignia from Stefano Lo Russo, the mayor of previous host city Turin, to Joanne Anderson, the mayor of Liverpool. London-based production company ModestTV was commissioned to produce the broadcast of the ceremony.

Postcards 
The "postcards" are 40-second video introductions shown on television whilst the stage is being prepared for the next entry. Filmed between February and April 2023, and directed by Tom Cook, with Carlo Massarella and Jane McGoldrick serving as executive producers, the postcards are based on the "United by Music" theme of the contest, and will "use innovative techniques to showcase each Eurovision entry as well as linking the UK and Ukraine". The postcards are produced by London-based production company Windfall Films and Ukrainian production company 23/32.

Participating countries 

On 10 February 2023, it was announced that the  would take part for the first time under its shorter English name of Czechia.

Returning artists 
The contest is set to feature four representatives who previously performed as lead vocalists for the same country. Also returning as lead artists are Marco Mengoni, who represented Italy in 2013, and Monika Linkytė, who represented Lithuania in  alongside Vaidas Baumila.

Semi-final 1 
The first semi-final will take place on 9 May 2023 at 20:00 BST (21:00 CEST). Fifteen countries will participate in the first semi-final.

Semi-final 2 
The second semi-final will take place on 11 May 2023 at 20:00 BST (21:00 CEST). Sixteen countries will participate in the second semi-final.

Final 
The final will take place on 13 May 2023 at 20:00 BST (21:00 CEST). Twenty-six countries will participate in the final, composed of the previous edition's winner Ukraine, the "Big Five" (which includes host country the United Kingdom), and the ten best-ranked entries of each of the two semi-finals. All thirty-seven participating countries with jury and televote, as well as non-participating countries under an aggregated online vote as "Rest of the World", will vote in the final.

Other countries 
Eligibility for potential participation in the Eurovision Song Contest requires a national broadcaster with active EBU membership that would be able to broadcast the contest via the Eurovision network. The EBU issued an invitation to participate in the contest to all active members. Associate member  did not need an invitation for the 2023 contest, as it had previously been granted permission to participate at least until this year.

Active EBU members 

 On 7 September 2022, the management board of Bulgarian broadcaster BNT decided not to participate in 2023, citing an expected increase in participation fees. Later, on 19 October 2022, BNT publicly confirmed to several Bulgarian news outlets that the country would not participate in 2023, citing financial constraints.
 On 22 November 2021, it was reported that part of the Monégasque state budget had been reserved for participation in the 2023 contest. However, the plans were delayed because the launch of Monaco's new public television channel, Monte-Carlo Riviera TV, was pushed back to between June to September 2023 instead of the initially outlined period of late 2022, putting the possibility of Monaco returning to the contest by 2024 at the earliest. On 5 September 2022, Monaco Media Diffusion confirmed that the country would not return in 2023.
 On 13 October 2022, Montenegrin broadcaster RTCG confirmed that the country would not participate in 2023, citing financial constraints and a lack of interest from sponsors.
 On 14 October 2022, Macedonian broadcaster MRT confirmed that the country would not participate in 2023, citing financial constraints. The broadcaster will, however, still air the contest, with a view of returning in 2024.

Associate EBU members 

  In October 2022, TV producer Zhan Mukanov stated that the Kazakh broadcaster Khabar Agency was in discussions with the EBU about potentially being invited to debut in 2023, stating that "there is every chance [for Kazakhstan] to enter the adult Eurovision next year" and that the country's participation in the Junior Eurovision Song Contest 2022 would have a "significant impact" on its chances of debuting. However, the country did not appear on the final list of participants.

Broadcasts 
All participating broadcasters may choose to have on-site or remote commentators providing insight and voting information to their local audience. While they must broadcast at least the semi-final they are voting in and the final, most broadcasters air all three shows with different programming plans. In addition, some non-participating broadcasters may still want to air the contest. In previous years, the European Broadcasting Union has also provided international live streams of both semi-finals and the final through their official YouTube channel with no commentary. It has not yet been confirmed whether this will happen in 2023.

The following are the broadcasters that have confirmed in whole or in part their broadcasting plans and/or commentators :

Notes

References

External links 
 

Scheduled events
 
2023
2023 song contests
Events affected by the 2022 Russian invasion of Ukraine
Music competitions in the United Kingdom
May 2023 events in the United Kingdom
Events in Liverpool
Music in Liverpool